Jörgen Strand (born 15 March 1963) is a politician of Åland.

Member of the Lagting (Åland parliament) 1999–2011
Deputy Premier (Vice lantråd) and Minister of Industry and Trade 2005–2007 
Deputy Premier (Vice lantråd) and Minister of Finance 2003–2005 
Chairman of the Åland Conservatives 2003–2007

See also
Government of Åland

External links
Picture of Jörgen Strand

1963 births
Living people
Politicians from Åland